Noe may refer to:

Places 
 Noe Valley, neighborhood in San Francisco
 River Noe, tributary of the River Derwent in Derbyshire, England
 Noé, Haute-Garonne, France
 Noé, Ivory Coast
 Noé, Yonne, France
 Noe Station, in Osaka, Japan, on the Keihan Main Line
 Noe Middle School, in Louisville, Kentucky
 Noe Woods, University of Wisconsin–Madison Arboretum, Madison, Wisconsin

People 
 Noe (given name), a given name in various cultures (including a list of people with the surname)
 Noe (surname), a surname in various cultures (including a list of people with the surname)
 Noah, a biblical figure, spelled Noé, Noè, Noë, or Noe in several languages, as well as formerly in English
 NOE (rapper), American rapper
 Gaspar Noe, Argentine film-maker

Acronyms 
 Nuclear Overhauser effect (NOE)
 Nap-of-the-earth flight
 Network of Excellence
 Nintendo of Europe
 Neoproterozoic oxygenation event (occurred from Mid Ediacaran to Mid Cambrian)

Other uses 
 Noé (opera), by Fromental Halévy, completed by Georges Bizet
 Noé, play by André Obey
 NOE, IATA airport code for Norden-Norddeich Airfield in Germany